Sam-Ang Sam is a Cambodian-American ethnomusicologist and 1994 recipient of a MacArthur Fellowship and a National Endowment for the Arts Fellowship (as part of the Apsara Ensemble) in 1998.

Sam-Ang Sam and his wife Chan Moly Sam spent "more than two decades" (as of 1993) "performing, teaching, researching, and documenting" their native country's music and dances. Having studied in Cambodia, they were in the Philippines when the Khmer Rouge took over Cambodia in 1975, and escaped the genocide that killed an estimated 90 percent of the country's musicians. He and his wife moved to the United States, and Sam-Ang got his doctorate in ethnomusicology in 1998 from Wesleyan University. He and his wife performed in various locations in the United States the between 1979 and 2005 with a dance troupe of Cambodian dancers. Their own performing troupe was called the Apsara Ensemble.

As founder of Sam-Ang Sam Ensemble, he has released several albums for sale in mainstream American markets in an attempt to revive Classical Khmer music and stimulate interest in the various Cambodian performing arts.

Recordings and video

Print Publications
 Dissertation: Ph.D., Wesleyan University, Conn. 1988

 Musical score (Khmer)

 title transcription as Kār paṅhāñ bī rapiap saṃbaḥ khmaer.

References

External links 
Cambodian music & dance in America
Page on Cambodian music by Sam-Ang Sam.
Cover of Silent Temples, Songful Hearts

American people of Cambodian descent
Cambodian musicians
American ethnomusicologists
Living people
MacArthur Fellows
National Endowment for the Arts Fellows
Year of birth missing (living people)